A chocolate temper meter is used to measure the presence of various types of the crystal forms IV, V in semi-molten cocoa butter in the preparation of well tempered chocolate. It works by measuring "the temperature of a standard weight of chocolate as it crystallizes when cooled in a controlled way." A modern, digital version, the Greer temper meter, can measure the degree of temper at any required time.

References

Chocolate industry